Akbar Jehan Abdullah (1916 – 11 July 2000) was an Indian Kashmiri politician. The wife of Abdullah Sheikh, three-time Chief Minister of Jammu and Kashmir, she twice served as a Member of India Parliament.

Akbar Jehan was the daughter of Michael Harry Nedou, the eldest son of the European owner of an Indian hotel chain that included Nedous Hotel in Srinagar, and his Kashmiri wife Mirjan. Nedou was himself the proprietor of a hotel at the tourist resort of Gulmarg. The writer Tariq Ali claims that Akbar Jehan was previously married in 1928 to an Arab Karam Shah who disappeared after a Calcutta newspaper Liberty reported that he was actually T. E. Lawrence (Lawrence of Arabia)Mubashhir Hassan (2008) a British Intelligence officer. He claims that Akbar Jehan was divorced by her first husband in 1929. She married Abdullah in 1933.

Political career
She served as a member of 6th  and 8th Lok Sabha, from 1977 to 1979,  and from 1984 to 1989, representing Kashmir's Srinagar and Anantnag constituencies, respectively.

She had the distinction of being the first President of Jammu and Kashmir Red Cross Society from 1947 to 1951. She also served as Chairman of State Level Committee of International Year of Women, 1975 and President of all India Family Welfare Association, State Branch, 1976 and All India Women's Conference, State Branch in 1977.

Later life and death
Jehan Abdullah died on 11 July 2000 in Srinagar at the age of 84.

Personal
She is the mother of the Kashmiri politician Farooq Abdullah, who succeeded his father Abdullah Sheikh as J&K  chief minister in 1982, and grandmother of Omar Abdullah.

References

External links 

Farooq's mother laid to rest
NC pays tributes to Begum Akbar Jehan

Akbar Jehan
20th-century Indian Muslims
India MPs 1977–1979
India MPs 1984–1989
1916 births
2000 deaths
Jammu & Kashmir National Conference politicians
Lok Sabha members from Jammu and Kashmir
Kashmiri people
Women in Jammu and Kashmir politics
20th-century Indian women politicians
20th-century Indian politicians